Athena Weston School District (29RJ) is a three-school district that serves the cities of Athena, Weston, and Adams, and the community of Mission in Umatilla County, Oregon, United States. The district was formed in the 1970s when the Athena and Weston school districts merged.

Demographics
In the 2009 school year, the district had 32 students classified as homeless by the Department of Education, or 5.7% of students in the district.

Schools
 Athena Elementary School
 Weston Middle School
 Weston-McEwen High School

See also
 List of school districts in Oregon

References

External links 
Athena Weston School District (official website)

School districts in Oregon
Education in Umatilla County, Oregon
1970s establishments in Oregon